Catherine Bertone (born 6 May 1972) is a Turkish-born female Italian marathon runner. She placed 25th at the 2016 Olympics.

Biography
Bertone's father is Italian and her mother is French. She was born in Turkey, where her father worked for Fiat at the time. The family later moved to Belo Horizonte in Brazil before returning to Italy, where Catherine received a medical degree from the University of Turin. She works as a doctor specializing in infectious diseases. She is married to Gabriele Beltrami and has daughters Corinne and Emilie. Her husband and her elder brother Silvio are also elite runners.

World records
Masters athletics
Marathon W45: 2:28:34, Berlin Germany, 23 September 2017 at the Berlin Marathon.

See also
 List of world records in masters athletics - Marathon Women
 Masters W45 marathon world record progression
 Naturalized athletes of Italy

References

External links
 

1972 births
Living people
Italian female long-distance runners
Italian female marathon runners
Place of birth missing (living people)
Athletes (track and field) at the 2016 Summer Olympics
Olympic athletes of Italy
World record holders in masters athletics
Italian masters athletes
Italian female mountain runners
Italian people of French descent